On Tour with Eric Clapton is a 1970 album by Delaney & Bonnie with Eric Clapton, recorded live at the Fairfield Halls, England. Released on Atco Records, it peaked at No. 29 on the Billboard 200 in April 1970, at No. 39 on the UK Albums Chart, and was certified a gold record by the RIAA.

Content and reissue
The album features Delaney and Bonnie's best-known touring band, including Eric Clapton, Jim Gordon, Carl Radle, Bobby Whitlock, and Dave Mason. Many of the players on this album went on to work with George Harrison on his post-Beatles debut album All Things Must Pass and with Clapton on his solo debut. The horn players Bobby Keys and Jim Price played on the albums Sticky Fingers and Exile on Main St. by the Rolling Stones, and join them for their 1972 STP Tour. Whitlock, Radle, and Gordon formed with Clapton his band Derek and the Dominos for Layla and Other Assorted Love Songs.

As no pictures of Delaney and Bonnie were deemed good enough for the album cover, a photo was used instead of a Rolls-Royce Silver Dawn in a desert, reportedly taken by manager Barry Feinstein while working as a photographer covering a Bob Dylan tour in 1966. Dylan's feet are those hanging from the car window.

On Tour was re-issued in 2010 as four-disc box set, packaged in a mock road case containing the complete performance from the Royal Albert Hall, plus a composite of the next night's performances at Colston Hall in Bristol, and both the early and late shows from the tour's final stop at Fairfield Halls in Croydon. George Harrison played slide guitar on the English leg of the tour that followed the Albert Hall performance, as well as in Scandinavia, which are represented on discs 2-4.

Reception

The album has received highly positive reviews, with many critics suggesting the album is superior to Clapton's prior project (Blind Faith). In the Rolling Stone Album Guide, the album is described as "a triumph", which is attributed to the fact the band was "one of the best" in "rock and roll". Writing for Rolling Stone, Mark Kemp said the album contained "wicked performances of the kind of country and boogie that would define Southern rock". Mojo described the album as "one of the two Rosetta Stones of roots rock'n'roll".

Track listing
Side one

Side two

2010 deluxe edition box set

Personnel
 Bonnie Bramlett — vocals
 Delaney Bramlett — guitars, vocals
 Eric Clapton — lead guitars, vocals
 Rita Coolidge — backing vocals
 Jim Gordon — drums, percussion
 George Harrison (under the pseudonym L'Angelo Misterioso) – guitars (discs two — four of box set only)
 Tex Johnson – percussion
 Bobby Keys — saxophone
 Dave Mason — guitars
 Carl Radle — bass guitar
 Jim Price — trombone, trumpet
 Bobby Whitlock — organ, keyboards, vocals

Production personnel
 Jimmy Miller, Delaney Bramlett — producers
 Bill Halverson — mixing
 Andy Johns, Glyn Johns, Tex Johnson — recording engineers
 Jim Price – horn arrangements
 Barry Feinstein – photography
 Tom Wilkes — design, photography

See also
 Layla and Other Assorted Love Songs
 All Things Must Pass

References

Delaney & Bonnie albums
Eric Clapton live albums
Albums produced by Jimmy Miller
1970 live albums
Atco Records live albums
Albums produced by Delaney Bramlett